Josiane Corneloup (born 30 September 1959) is a French pharmacist and politician of the Republicans (LR) who been representing Saône-et-Loire's 2nd constituency in the National Assembly since the 2017 election.

Political career 
Corneloup was elected to the French Parliament in the 2017 legislative election.

In parliament, Corneloup serves on the Committee on Social Affairs. In this capacity, she is the parliament's rapporteur on the government's decision to declare a state of emergency amid the COVID-19 pandemic in France in 2020. 

In addition to her committee assignments, Corneloup is part of the French-Senegalese Parliamentary Friendship Group.

According to Le Monde, Corneloup was one of the wealthiest members of parliament at the time of her election.

Political positions 
In July 2019, Corneloup voted against the French ratification of the European Union’s Comprehensive Economic and Trade Agreement (CETA) with Canada.

Ahead of the 2022 presidential elections, Corneloup publicly declared her support for Michel Barnier as the Republicans’ candidate.

References

External links 
 Official Website
 Biography at the National Assembly

Living people
1959 births
People from Le Creusot
People from Saône-et-Loire
Women members of the National Assembly (France)
21st-century French politicians
21st-century French women politicians
French pharmacists
Politicians from Bourgogne-Franche-Comté
Deputies of the 15th National Assembly of the French Fifth Republic
The Republicans (France) politicians
Deputies of the 16th National Assembly of the French Fifth Republic